Robert Jordan (born January 29, 1986) is a former Canadian football wide receiver  who  played for the BC Lions of the Canadian Football League (CFL), and the Florida Tarpons of the Indoor Football League

College career
Jordan played college football for the California Golden Bears. Jordan set the University of California record for consecutive games with receptions with 42 and started more games at 37 than any other player on the 2007 team. He attended Hayward High School in Hayward, California.

Professional career

San Francisco 49ers
Jordan signed a free agent contract with the National Football League San Francisco 49ers on April 28, 2008.

On July 29, 2008, Jordan was released from the San Francisco 49ers (upon his own personal decision), so that he could tend to a death in his family. Ex-head coach Mike Nolan was reported saying that he wanted to bring the un-drafted rookie back some time in the near future so that he may attend practice squad.

British Columbia Lions
On April 13, 2010, Jordan signed with the British Columbia Lions. On July 26, 2010, he was released by the Lions.

Florida Tarpons
On August 15, 2011, Jordan signed with the Florida Tarpons.

Personal
He is the cousin of former Cal running back and current Oakland Raiders player Marshawn Lynch, New York Giants quarterback Josh Johnson and former Oakland Raiders quarterback JaMarcus Russell.

References

External links
Just Sports Stats
Player Profile
Family Man The Hand Gesture Sweeping the Football World Began as a Symbol of the Values That Robert Jordan Lives Every Day

1986 births
Living people
Players of American football from Oakland, California
American football wide receivers
California Golden Bears football players
San Francisco 49ers players
BC Lions players
Players of Canadian football from Oakland, California
Florida Tarpons players